Magnus Åkerlund (born April 25, 1986) is a Swedish professional ice hockey goaltender, currently playing with IF Sundsvall in the HockeyAllsvenskan. He has previously played in the top Swedish Hockey League with HV71 and Timrå IK. He was selected 137th overall by the Carolina Hurricanes in the 2004 NHL Entry Draft.

He joined IF Sundsvall in the HockeyAllsvenskan after two seasons in the Danish Metal Ligaen with the Aalborg Pirates on June 16, 2014.

References

External links 

1986 births
Aalborg Pirates players
Borås HC players
Carolina Hurricanes draft picks
HV71 players
Living people
IF Sundsvall Hockey players
Swedish ice hockey goaltenders
Timrå IK players